The Château d'Yèvre-le-Châtel is a ruined castle in the commune of Yèvre-la-Ville in the Loiret département of France. The castle dates from the first quarter of the 13th century and is located in the hamlet of Yèvre-le-Châtel, to the north of the commune.

The property of the commune, it has been listed since 1862 as a monument historique by the French Ministry of Culture.

See also
List of castles in France

References

External links
 
 

Ruined castles in Centre-Val de Loire
Monuments historiques of Centre-Val de Loire
Loiret